Sanchai Ratiwatana and Sonchat Ratiwatana won the first edition of the tournament 4–6, 7–6(7–1), [13–11] against Ruan Roelofse and Kittipong Wachiramanowong

Seeds

Draw

Draw

References
 Main Draw

ATP China International Tennis Challenge – Anning - Doubles
2012 Doubles